David Ochieng Ouma is a Kenyan politician who is the leader of the Movement for Democracy and Growth. He is MP for Ugenya Constituency.

See also 

 13th Parliament of Kenya

References 

Living people
Year of birth missing (living people)
Members of the 11th Parliament of Kenya
Members of the 13th Parliament of Kenya
21st-century Kenyan politicians
Leaders of political parties in Kenya
People from Siaya County